A. Santha Kumar (1968/9 – 16 June 2021) was an Indian Malayalam language playwright and screenplay writer from Kerala state, South India. He won the Kerala Sahitya Akademi Award for Drama in 2010 for the work Maram Peyyunnu.

Early life
He was born as the son of Imbichunni Master and Kalyani. He graduated from the Arts and Science College Kozhikode.

Literary career
He had scripted and directed more than 60 plays and published five books. He composed the screenplay for the film Bhoomiyile Manohara Swakaryam.

Works
Maram Peyyunnu
Karkkadakam
Rachiyamma
Karutha Vidhava
Chirutha Chilathokke Marannu Poyi
Kurudan Poocha
Oru Desham Nuña Parayunu
Nasser Ninte Perenthanu
Sugha Nidhragalileeke
Otta Rathriyuda Kamugimar

Awards and honours 
Santhakumar received Kerala Sangeetha Nataka Akademi Award in 1999 for his work, Perum Kollan. He also received Nilambur Balan Award for his overall contribution to the field of drama. He received Kerala Sahitya Akademi endowment for his drama Kurudan Poocha, Thoppil Bhasi Award and Balan K Nair Award for his drama Chirutha Chilathokke Marannu Poyi, Atlas Kairali Award for his drama Mrigashala. He won the Kerala Sahitya Akademi Award for Drama in 2010 for his work Maram Peyyunnu, He also received the Kerala State Institute of Children's Literature Award. He received the Kerala Sangeetha Nataka Akademi Award for drama composition and direction, Bharat Murali Award of Bahrain Drama Theatre, and Pavanan Foundation Award in 2016. He also received Abu Dhabi Sakthi Award for his drama Karutha Vidhava and   
Edasseri Award for his drama Nasser Ninte Perenthanu. His ‘Swapnavetta’ was published by Oxford University as ‘Dream Hunt’ and it was included in the degree syllabus of Kerala and Calicut universities. His drama Kakkakinavu's English translation was also published by Sahitya Akademi, India's National Academy of Letters' bimonthly journal, Indian Literature.

Death
He died on 16 June 2021, at the age of 52 while undergoing treatment for leukaemia and had been confirmed to have COVID-19. He was cremated at West Hill crematorium.

References

1960s births
2021 deaths
Dramatists and playwrights from Kerala
Indian male dramatists and playwrights
Malayalam-language writers
Malayalam-language dramatists and playwrights
Recipients of the Kerala Sahitya Akademi Award
People from Kozhikode district
20th-century Indian dramatists and playwrights
20th-century Indian male writers
Screenwriters from Kerala
21st-century Indian dramatists and playwrights
21st-century Indian male writers
Deaths from the COVID-19 pandemic in India
Recipients of the Abu Dhabi Sakthi Award
Recipients of the Kerala Sangeetha Nataka Akademi Award